Manus Boyle (born 1966) is an Irish former Gaelic footballer who played for Na Cealla Beaga and the Donegal county team. He writes a column for the Donegal Democrat ("The Breaking Ball") and is a health coach.

He played county football from 1985 to 1998, mostly at forward and was a free kick specialist.

He debuted for Donegal at 18 in 1985, fell out with manager Tom Conaghan in the 1980s, missing the 1989 Ulster SFC final, Brian McEniff restored him to the team in time for the 1990 Ulster SFC.

He played his last competitive game for Donegal in the 1998 Ulster SFC final against Derry. Earlier the same year, he contracted a virus that caused severe weight loss. He could not start the 1st round but played the semi-final against Cavan. 

In May 2012, the Irish Independent named him as part of Donegal's "greatest team" of the past 50 years.

At club level he played for Na Cealla Beaga. He co-managed the team with Barry McGowan until 2008. Aged 44, returned to play football as his club reached 2010 Donegal SFC final.

He played soccer for St Catherine's.

Since March 2002, he writes a column for the Donegal Democrat, "The Breaking Ball".

In 2016, aged 50, he returned to education to study "Applied Health and Wellness Coaching" at St Angela's College in Sligo.

Honours
Donegal
 All-Ireland Senior Football Championship: 1992
 Ulster Senior Football Championship: 1990, 1992
 All-Ireland Under-21 Football Championship: 1987
 Ulster Under-21 Football Championship: 1987

Individual
 All-Ireland Senior Football Championship Final Man of the Match: 1992

References

External links
 Manus Boyle at GAAinfo.com
 Boyle's points in the 1992 All-Ireland Senior Football Championship Final: 1st 2nd 3rd 4th 5th 6th 7th 8th 9th

1960s births
Living people
Association footballers not categorized by position
Donegal inter-county Gaelic footballers
Gaelic footballers who switched code
Gaelic football forwards
Gaelic football managers
Irish columnists
Killybegs Gaelic footballers
Republic of Ireland association footballers
St Catherine's F.C. players
Ulster inter-provincial Gaelic footballers
Winners of one All-Ireland medal (Gaelic football)